Paula Seling (born 25 December 1978) is a Romanian singer, songwriter, record producer, DJ, and television personality. Raised in Baia Mare, she attended Gheorghe Șincai National College and later moved to Bucharest to pursue a career in music.

She has released more than thirteen albums (including three Christmas albums) and over twenty singles, which include two top-ten hits in the Romanian Top 100, a minor European hit which entered the charts in Finland and Norway, as well as the UK Singles Chart.

Paula is trilingual and speaks, writes and performs in French, English and Romanian; additionally, she performs in Italian. She has also provided the Romanian voice in Cars 2, for Holley Shiftwell. She is an outspoken supporter of personal freedom, individual rights and human rights.

Paula represented Romania in the Eurovision Song Contest 2010, together with Ovidiu Cernăuțeanu, with the song "Playing with Fire". They finished third in the finals. She then participated in Dansez Pentru Tine (Romanian "Dancing with the Stars") where she finished third.
Starting October 2011, Seling was a juror and mentor in the Romanian X Factor. In 2011, she collaborated with Al Bano and Plan D.
In 2011/2012 she sang a song called "I'll Show You" with Alexander Rybak. The song, written by Rybak, premiered on 30 May 2012.

In 2012, she was chosen by Walt Disney to record the song "My Spirit Flies" ("Chiar pot zbura"), for the Pixar Academy Award-winning animation Brave.

Personal life
Paula Seling was born in Baia Mare, a city in North Western Romania, on 25 December 1978. She has a brother named Paul. After graduating from the Gheorghe Şincai National College in June 1997, she studied journalism in Bucharest, graduating in 2002.

She has been playing piano since she was 6 years old, having studied at the "School of Performing Arts" with Mariana Tilca. At the age of 10, she began to sing in the school choir, soon becoming a soloist. At the age of 15, she joined a band, the "Enders", as a piano player.

Paula has been married to Radu Bucura since 2005, a friend from her teenage years and the drummer in Dana Nalbaru's band. She is a Romanian Orthodox and is also anti-abortion. She attended the March for Life, in Bucharest, in March 2016.

Career 

In 1995, she won the Best Instrumental Interpreter award at the "Steaua de cristal" (The Crystal Star) Contest in Botoșani, "Ursulețul de aur" (The Golden Teddy Bear) award in Baia Mare, and first place at the "Armonia" (Harmony) Festival in Bucharest. That year she met Paul Nanca of the Phoenix Cultural Foundation and most of her musician friends who are still with her today.

In 1996, she won the "Aurelian Andreescu" trophy under the guidance of Anda Popp and she had her first performance at the "Golden Stag", in the show "Viața de român" (Romanian life) as a backup vocalist.

In 1997, she opened for Joan Baez, participated in the Mamaia Trophy with the song "Trurli" a Romanian song, and released her first album in English, "Only Love", recorded at Sound House Records, Germany; then sang in the show "Din darul magilor" (From the Magi's Gift) in December 1997.

Paula Seling competed in the Selectia Nationala 1998 teaming up with band Talisman with the song "Te iubesc". They came in fourth (with 565 points), as the jury voted them in second place and tele-voters put them in sixth place. The special jury considered their song the most suitable for the Eurovision Song Contest 1998.

Seling competed in the Mamaia Festival 2001 with her performance of "Ploaie în luna lui marte" (Rain in the Moon of Mars)  (a cover of Nicu Alifantis' older hit). She received national recognition after winning the Golden Stag Festival in 2002.

Seling was signed by Roton Records in the fall of 2002, after winning The Golden Stag International trophy. In 2003, she won an MTV Romanian Award for "Best Music Video" for a video which she co-directed. In early 2005, she launched her own record label, "Unicorn Records Romania", along with her father and brother. She has sung duets with Al Bano, Anita Doth (from 2 Unlimited) and Tony Hawks. She has performed as an opening act for Joan Baez (27 June 1997), Chick Corea (9 November 1998), Michael Bolton (7 July 2007), and Beyoncé (26 October 2007). In 2008, she performed a song together with "manele" singer Florin Salam at the Bucharest Symphonic Orchestra.

Paula Seling decided to perform rock, jazz, jazz-rock, soul, and rhythm and blues. At the time, unplugged music was popular so Paula suggested a collaboration with the Phoenix Foundation to create an album.

Dana Cristescu proposed involving Nicu Alifantis in composing and producing this album. Seling offered her some songs and she chose "Ploaie în luna lui marte" to be the first track.

Paula remembers "all the bright eyes looking at me kindly as I was looking out to the audience and hundreds of voices were singing with me "ploouuaaa infernaaaal" and "noooi ne iubeaaam..." it's an amazing feeling. It was nice to see people happy and enjoying my music! "

The First Album and "Ploaie în Luna Lui Marte" Success 

The song eventually got to George Zafiu, DJ at Radio 21, who started to broadcast it on his shows. After many requests, Paula's team agreed to record the first album in Romanian named Ştiu că exist/ "I know I exist" and "Colinde și cântece sfinte" (Christmas carols and Holy songs) with the Romanian singer-songwriter Narcisa Suciu. It represents the best of her musical self study at that time.

At the same time, Paula Seling won the "Ascending Star" award by Avantaje magazine.

On November 9, 1998, she was the opening act for Chick Corea's concert in Bucharest. Following the concert Seling collaborated with percussionist Lucian Maxim on a project which was a fusion of jazz, classical music and old Romanian gypsy music found in the traditional remakes of Marius Mihalache.

In 1999 Seling released an album called "De dragoste" (For Love) which gathered ten songs composed by Nicu Alifantis. It was Seling's first complete album and included songs such as "Almost Silence"/"Aproape liniște"; "The Shadow"/"Umbra"; and "How Good That You Exist"/"Ce bine că ești".

Nicu Alifantis influenced her career path. "Ploaie în luna lui Marte" brought her "The Hit of the Year" award at the Mamaia Festival in the same year. After all this, Paula took a break while trying to find her way in life and her music. "I wanted to sing, but I also wanted to give real attention to the courses I had registered for."

Eventually, Seling started to write music and lyrics with her brother, Paul Seling. They started to plan an album that would mark a change in her music, attitude, music and sound.

Performances and Music Videos 
In January 2001 Paula released the album "Mă voi întoarce" (I will return). The song "Lângă mine" (Next to me), a duet with the band Direcția 5, more precisely with Cristi Enache was also included in their album.

They worked on the album until the fall of 2001. Paul and Paula succeeded to mostly finalise the album and they decided to include Cezar Stănciulescu and Cristi Ştefănescu, members of the band NSK. The two were excellent professionals to work with. It was the first album in which all the lyrics were written exclusively by Paula. The title of the album was "Știi ce înseamnă (să fii fericit)" (You know what it means (to be happy)), and includes songs like "Promise"/"Promit", one of Paula's most famous songs, that was available in Romanian, and in English, as well. Also in 2001, a truly intense year, Paula released the album " Prima selecție " (First selection), a song collection from concerts, duets and remakes of some of her best songs. In the same period, the teen star, worked with an artist that she found very interesting: Puya from La Familia. They arrived early at the studio where she was recording a song with a strong message and Puya had not found a female vocalist yet. The song seemed very suitable to Paula's abilities and she offered to record it with him.

The song named "Fii pregătit" (Be ready) was released and was very popular so a few weeks later, they were presenting it in a performance in Mamaia. As 2001 ended, Seling received The Award for the best female singer at the Awards of the Romanian Music Industries. It was very important, because it proved to her that she was on the right track with her music and performances. After that, Paula also had the opportunity to collaborate with one of the best directors from Romania, Andreea Păduraru, for the music video of the song "Serile verii" (Summer evenings) (of the album "You know what it means"/"Știi ce înseamnă").

This music video brought Paula the award for the best artist in a Music Video and the award for the Best Music Video on the MTV Music Awards Romania 2002. 

At the Golden Stag Festival, Seling performed two of her songs: "Noapte caldă" (Warm Night) and "That old devil called love".

International Collaborations 

In 2002, Seling played herself in the TV series documentary Open House. Tony Hawks, producer, composer, director and writer wanted to cast a documentary movie on the Discovery Channel, a movie, named "One Hit Wonderland", that reveals the recipe for the success of a song. He picked Paula as a study subject in Romania, they recorded a song, his composition, in his studio from London and then, the city started promoting it. They performed the song on Gloria Hunniford's show on Channel 5 in London.

2003 brought Seling a management agreement with a French producer. In the same year, the singer released the album "Fara sfârșit" (Endless) with 17 songs In 2004 she was nominated for MTV Music Awards as the best artist for the same song (Time). In 2005 Paula married Radu Bucura;and both opened a production studio, UNICORN RECORDS.

In 2006. Radu and Paula released a unique album called "De sarbatori" /"For Holidays" with traditional Christmas carols and songs that were sacred to Paula.

In 207, Seling was the opening act for Michael Bolton in Brașov on 7 July and for Beyoncé in Cluj on 22 October.

Al Bano Collaboration 

Seling and her team, decided to make a "Best of", sort of a compilation with the most important songs of the 10 years of her musical career. It included 19 tracks, some of them with their original orchestration, some of them with a new production, remade in Unicorn Records studio. The album was called "1998–2008".

She won the 3rd Place Selectia Nationala Eurovision Final with the song "Seven Days".

2009
Her album Culeg Vise/Believe was released in 2009. The first single from this album is "Believe" and it reached the top 40 of Romanian Top 100. She attended the 2009 Golden Stag Festival, in September, as a judge, where she met her collaborator Ovidiu Cernăuţeanu.

Eurovision Song Contest 2010
Ovi called her back in November, inviting her to participate together at the 2010 Selectia Nationala. They re-recorded the original version of the song and signed up for pre-selection. They were selected as a finalist for the Romanian selection show on 27 January 2010 and won the competition on 6 March 2010.

Seling and Ovi performed "Playing with Fire" live in the second Eurovision Song Contest 2010 semi-final, in Oslo on 27 May 2010. They finished 4th in the semi-final and competed in the final on 29 May 2010, where they finished 3rd. This is the second time that Romania had achieved this, its highest placement in the Eurovision Song Contest.

2010: After Eurovision
In 2010, she joined a Romanian dance competition, "Dansez pentru tine" (the Romanian version of Dancing With the Stars), with her partner Tudor Moldoveanu. The pair came in 3rd in the competition.
Seling was the co-host of the Eurovision Song Contest 2011 Romanian national final, held on New Year's Eve night on TVR 1, along with Ovi and Marina Almasan-Socaciu.

New album and X Factor

In early 2011, Seling released a new song entitled "I Feel Free".

In April 2011, Romanian TV station Antena 1 (part of the Intact Media Group) announced that the British—concept reality/musical contest show X Factor will come to Romania as well. In early June, it was announced that Seling was to be one of three judges of the contest.  

Seling recorded duets with Alexander Ryback, Ovi and Al Bano in late 2011 to be put together alongside "I Feel Free" and another at least eight songs on for a new album due in 2012. In February 2012, it was announced that Seling will be returning to Selectia Nationala 2012, in order to represent Romania in the Eurovision Song Contest 2012. Despite this, she said the song she prepared for the contest wasn't ready and promised a comeback for Eurovision Song Contest 2013.

She was the spokesperson for Romania and presented their votes during the grand final of the Eurovision Song Contest 2012. In 2013, she was selected to be the endorser for a Romanian moisturising cream, Gerovital. The brand Loncolor, proposed to Paula to become their endorser in 2012,  representing LONCOLOR enVogue 535.

Eurovision Song Contest 2014

On 1 March 2014, Paula Seling and Ovi won the Romanian National Selection 2014 and were selected as the Romanian entry for the Eurovision Song Contest 2014 in Copenhagen with the song "Miracle".

Seling and Ovi performed "Miracle" live in the second Eurovision Song Contest 2014 semi-final, in Copenhagen, on 8 May 2014. They qualified from the semi-finals and competed in the finals on 10 May 2014 and finished 12th.

Awards and nominations

Discography

Albums

Singles

Dubbing

References

External links

 Official website — paulaseling.ro
 Interview @ Radio Lynx Romania

1978 births
Living people
Eurovision Song Contest entrants of 2010
Eurovision Song Contest entrants of 2014
Members of the Romanian Orthodox Church
People from Baia Mare
Eurovision Song Contest entrants for Romania
Romanian women pop singers
Romanian anti-abortion activists
English-language singers from Romania
French-language singers
Italian-language singers
21st-century Romanian singers
21st-century Romanian women singers
Golden Stag winners